Hassan Ahamada (born 13 April 1981) is a French former professional footballer who played as a striker.

Career
Whilst at FC Nantes Ahamada contributed 12 appearances as his side won 2000–01 French Division 1.

References

External links

1981 births
Living people
Sportspeople from Brest, France
Association football forwards
French footballers
French sportspeople of Comorian descent
Stade Brestois 29 players
FC Nantes players
SC Bastia players
S.C. Beira-Mar players
C.F. Os Belenenses players
LB Châteauroux players
Vannes OC players
USJA Carquefou players
Ligue 1 players
Ligue 2 players
Championnat National players
France under-21 international footballers
France youth international footballers
French expatriate footballers
French expatriate sportspeople in Portugal
Expatriate footballers in Portugal
Footballers from Brittany